Ian Terence Quigley (16 October 1931 – 3 May 2016) was a former New Zealand politician of the Labour Party.

Biography

Quigley was born in Leeston in 1931, the son of William Quigley. He received his education at Waitaki Boys' High School. He gained employment as a carpenter with the Otago Education Board before moving to Cromwell in 1960. There he became the proprietor of a petrol station and garage. In 1957, he married Marian Brown, the daughter of Cecil Brown. They had one son and three daughters.

Quigley served on the Cromwell Borough Council (1962–1975), and was the Deputy Mayor (1971–1975). He was also a member of the Otago Regional Development Council (1973–1975), and Otago Council (1970–1975). He was regional Civil Defence controller for the Vincent County combined area from 1970 to 1975. He was also a member of the Clutha River Development Committee.

Despite initial apprehensions, he took up the offer and became a candidate. Quigley won the seat represented the Otago Central electorate for Labour for three years from 1972 to 1975, when he was defeated by Warren Cooper. His majority in 1972 was 1,483 votes.

Quigley had no direct involvement in political activities thereafter, but still took an intense interest in politics and was a member the committee of the Former Parliamentarians Association. He shifted from Cromwell to Timaru and worked at DB Breweries before retiring in 1999. He also coordinated the famous Clydesdale team of horses.

He was awarded the New Zealand 1990 Commemoration Medal. For recreation, he enjoyed boating and golf. He died on 3 May 2016.

Notes

References

1931 births
2016 deaths
People educated at Waitaki Boys' High School
New Zealand Labour Party MPs
Unsuccessful candidates in the 1975 New Zealand general election
Members of the New Zealand House of Representatives
New Zealand MPs for South Island electorates
People from Leeston
Deputy mayors of places in New Zealand